The male reproductive system consists of a number of sex organs that play a role in the process of human reproduction. These organs are located on the outside of the body and within the pelvis.

The main male sex organs are the penis and the testicles which produce semen and sperm, which, as part of sexual intercourse, fertilize an ovum in the female's body; the fertilized ovum (zygote) develops into a fetus, which is later born as an infant.

The corresponding system in females is the female reproductive system.

External genital organs

Penis 

The penis is the male intromittent organ. It has a long shaft and an enlarged bulbous-shaped tip called the glans penis, which supports and is protected by the foreskin. When the male becomes sexually aroused, the penis becomes erect and ready for sexual activity. Erection occurs because sinuses within the erectile tissue of the penis become filled with blood. The arteries of the penis are dilated while the veins are compressed so that blood flows into the erectile cartilage under pressure. The penis is supplied by the pudendal artery.

Scrotum 
The scrotum is a pouch-like structure that hangs behind the penis. It holds and protects the testicles. It also contains numerous nerves and blood vessels. During times of lower temperatures, the Cremaster muscle contracts and pulls the scrotum closer to the body, while the Dartos muscle gives it a wrinkled appearance; when the temperature increases, the Cremaster and Dartos muscles relax to bring down the scrotum away from the body and remove the wrinkles respectively.

The scrotum remains connected with the abdomen or pelvic cavity through the inguinal canal. (The spermatic cord, formed from spermatic artery, vein and nerve bound together with connective tissue passes into the testis through inguinal canal.)

Internal genital organs

Testis 

Testis has two major functions: To produce sperm by meiotic division of germ cells within the seminiferous tubules, and to synthesize and secrete androgens that regulate the male reproductive functions. The site of production of androgens is the Leydig cells that are located in the interstitium between seminiferous tubules.

Epididymis 

The epididymis is a long whitish mass of tightly coiled tube. The sperm that are produced in the seminiferous tubules flow into the epididymis. During passage via the epididymis, the sperm undergo maturation and are concentrated by the action of ion channels located on the apical membrane of the epididymis.

Vas deferens 

It carries the spermatozoa from the epididymis to ejaculatory duct.

Accessory glands 

Three accessory glands provide fluids that lubricate the duct system and nourish the sperm cells. They are the seminal vesicles, the prostate gland, and the bulbourethral glands (Cowper glands).

Development
The embryonic and prenatal development of the male reproductive system is the process whereby the reproductive organs grow, mature and are established. It begins with a single fertilized egg and culminates 38 weeks later with birth of a male child. It is a part of the stages of sexual differentiation. The development of the male reproductive system coincides with the urinary system. Their development can also be described together as the development of the urinary and reproductive organs.

Sexual determination  

Sexual identity is determined at fertilization when the genetic sex of the zygote has been initialized by a sperm cell containing either an X or Y chromosome. If this sperm cell contains an X chromosome it will coincide with the X chromosome of the ovum and a female child will develop. A sperm cell carrying a Y chromosome results in an XY combination, and a male child will develop.

Genetic sex determines whether the gonads will be testes or ovaries. In the developing embryo if the testes are developed, it will produce and secrete male sex hormones during late embryonic development and cause the secondary sex organs of the male to develop.

Other embryonic reproductive structures 
The structures are masculinized by secretions of the testes:
 urogenital sinus 
 genital tubercle
 urogenital folds
 cloacal membrane
 labioscrotal folds
The prostate gland derives from the urogenital sinus, and the other embryonic structures differentiate into the external genitalia. In the absence of testicular secretions, the female genitalia are formed.

External structures 

At six weeks post conception, the differentiation of the external genitalia in the male and female has not taken place. At eight weeks, a distinct phallus is present during the indifferent stage. By the 10th-12th week, the genitalia are distinctly male or female being and derived from their homologous structures. At 16 weeks post conception, the genitalia are formed and distinct.

The masculinization of the embryonic reproductive structures occurs as a result of testosterone secreted by the embryonic testes. Testosterone, however, is not the active agent within these organs. Once inside the target cells, testosterone is converted by means of an enzyme called 5α-reductase into the dihydrotestosterone (DHT).  DHT mediates the androgen effect in these organs.

Testes 

At nine weeks, male differentiation of the gonads and the testes is well underway. Internal changes include the formation of the tubular seminar Chris tubules in the Rete testis from the primary sex cord.  Developing on the outside surface of each testis is a Phibro muscular cord called the gubernaculum. This structure attaches to the inferior portion of the testis and extends to the labial sacral fold of the same side at the same time, a portion of the embryonic mesonephric duct adjacent to the testis becomes attached and convoluted informs the epididymis. Another portion of the mesonephric duct becomes the ductus deferens.

The seminal vesicles form from lateral outgrowths of the caudal and of each mesonephric duct the prostate gland arises from an Indo dermal outgrowth of the urogenital sinus the bulbourethral glands develop from outgrowths in the membrane-like portion of the urethra. 

The descent of the testes to its final location at the anterior abdominal wall, followed by the development of the gubernaculum, which subsequently pulls and translocates the testis down into the developing scrotum. Ultimately, the passageway closes behind the testis. A failure in this process can cause indirect inguinal hernia or an infantile hydrocoele. The testes descend into the scrotal sac between the sixth and 10th week. Dissent into this not occur until about the 28th week when compared and we know canals form and the abdominal wall to provide openings from the pelvic cavity to the scrotal sac. The process by which a testis to send is not well understood but it seems to be associated with the shortening of the gubernaculum, which is attached to the testis and extends to the inguinal canal to the wall of the scrotum as a testis to sense it passes to the side of the urinary bladder and anterior to the symphysis pubis.  It carries with it the ductus deference, that is testicular vessels and nerves, a portion of the abdominal muscle, and lymph vessels. All of the structures remain attached to the testis and form what is known as the spermatic cord by the time the testis is in the scrotal sac, the gubernaculum is no more than a remnant of scar like tissue.

External genitalia

The external genitalia of the male is distinct from those of the female by the end of the ninth week. Prior to that, the genital tubercle in both sexes is a phallus. The urethral groove forms on the ventral surface of the phallus early in development during the differentiation of the external genitalia. This is caused by the androgens produced and secreted by the testes. Androgen induced development causes the elongation and differentiation of the phallus into a penis, a fusion of the urogenital folds surrounding the urethral groove along the ventral surface of the penis, and a midline closure of the labioscrotal folds.  This closure forms the wall of the scrotum the external genitalia. The external genitalia are completely formed by the end of the 12th week.

At birth, the development of the prepubertal male reproductive system is completed. During the second trimester of pregnancy, testosterone secretion in the male declines so that at birth the testes are inactive. Gonadotropin secretion is low until the beginning of puberty.

Summary

The genetic sex is determined by whether a Y bearing or next bearing sperm fertilizes the open; the presence or absence of a Y chromosome in turn determines whether the gonads of the embryo will be testes or ovaries; and the presence or absence of testes, finally, determines whether the sex accessory organs and external genitalia will be male or female. This sequence is understandable in light of the fact that both male and female embryos develop within the maternal environment - high in estrogen secreted by the mother's ovaries and the placenta. If estrogen determined the gender, all embryos would become feminized.

Puberty 

During puberty, increased gonadotropin secretion stimulates a rise in sex steroids creation from the testes. The increased secretion of testosterone from the testes during puberty causes the male secondary sexual characteristics to be manifested.

Male secondary sex characteristics include:

 Growth of body hair, including underarm, abdominal, chest hair and pubic hair. 
 Growth of facial hair.
 Enlargement of larynx (Adam's apple) and deepening of voice.
 Increased stature; adult males are taller than adult females, on average.
 Heavier skull and bone structure.
 Increased muscle mass and strength.
 Broadening of shoulders and chest; shoulders wider than hips.
 Increased secretions of oil and sweat glands.

Secondary development includes the increased activity of the eccrine sweat glands and sebaceous glands along with the darkening of the skin in the scrotal region.

Clinical significance

Chromosomal abnormalities 

Chromosomal abnormalities can occur during fertilization impacting the development of the male reproductive system. The genotype of the male consists of a Y chromosome paired with an X chromosome.  Female sex is determined by the absence of a Y chromosome. Some individuals are male who have the XX male syndrome and androgen insensitivity syndrome. This occurs when one X chromosome contains a segment of the Y chromosome, which was inserted into the X chromosome of the father's sperm. Rarely females are born with the XY genotype. They are found to be missing the same portion of the Y chromosome it was inserted into the chromosome of XX males. The gene for sexual differentiation in humans, called the testis determining factor (TDF), is located on the short arm of the Y chromosome. The presence or absence of the Y chromosome determines whether the embryo will have testes or ovaries. An abnormal number of sex chromosomes (aneuploidy) may can occur. This includes Turner's syndrome - a single X chromosome is present, Klinefelter's syndrome - two X chromosomes and a Y chromosome are present, XYY syndrome and XXYY syndrome. Other less common chromosomal arrangements include: triple X syndrome, 48, XXXX, and 49, XXXXX. 

The observable, visual differences become apparent between male or the female reproductive organs are not seen initially. Maturation continues as the medial aspect of each mesonephros grows to form the genital ridge. The genital ridge continues to grow behind the developing peritoneal membrane. By week six, string-like cell congregations called primitive sex cords form within the enlarging genital ridge. Externally, a swelling called the genital tubercle appears above the cloacal membrane. 

External distinctions are not observed even by the eighth week of pre-embryonic development. This is the indifferent stage during which the gonads are relatively large and have an outer cortex of primitive sex cords and an inner medulla.

Specialized primordial germ cells are forming and migrating from the yolk sac to the embryonic gonads during week eight and nine. These are the spermatogonia in the developing male. Before seven weeks after fertilization, the gonads have the potential to become either testes or ovaries. Reproductive sex organs for both male and female are derived from the same embryonic tissues and are considered homologous tissues or organs.

After the testes have differentiated, male sex hormones, called androgens, are secreted from interstitial cells (cells of Leydig). The major androgens secreted by these cells is testosterone and secretion begins 8 to 10 weeks after conception. Testosterone secretion reaches a peak at 12 to 14 weeks, and declines to very low levels by the end of the second trimester (about 21 weeks). Levels are the barely detectable 4–6 months of age postnatal. High levels of testosterone will not appear again until the time of puberty.

Internal accessory sex organs to develop and most of these are derived from two systems of embryonic ducts. Male accessory organs are derived from mesonephric (wolfian) ducts.  The developing tubules within the testes secretes a polypeptide Müllerian inhibition factor (MIF). MIF causes the regression of the paramesonephritic ducts 60 days after fertilization.  Testosterone secretion by the interstitial cells of the testes then causes the growth and development of the mesonephric ducts into male secondary sex organs. The Müllerian ducts atrophy, but traces of their anterior ends are represented by the appendices testis (hydatids of Morgagni of the male), while their terminal fused portions form the utriculus on the floor of the prostatic urethra. This is due to the production of Anti-Müllerian hormone by the Sertoli cells of the testes.

Gallery

See also 
 Evolution of sexual reproduction
 Male infertility
 Oncofertility
 Reproductive system
 Spermatogenesis

References

Bibliography 

 
 
  

 
 

Human male reproductive system